From Here to Eternity is a 1977 studio album by Italian producer Giorgio Moroder. It peaked at number 130 on the Billboard 200 chart. The album's title track peaked at number 16 on the UK Singles Chart.

Critical reception

John Bush of AllMusic gave the album 4.5 stars out of 5, saying: "The metallic beats, high-energy impact, and futuristic effects prove that Moroder was ahead of his time like few artists of the 1970s (Kraftwerk included), and the free-form songwriting on tracks like 'Lost Angeles', 'First Hand Experience in Second Hand Love', and the title track are priceless." Dominique Leone of Pitchfork gave the album an 8.6 out of 10, calling it "a marvel for disco historians" and "a perfect nugget of dance music for anyone else".

In 2004, Pitchfork placed it at number 88 on the "Top 100 Albums of the 1970s" list. In 2015, Thump placed it at number 19 on the "99 Greatest Dance Albums of All Time" list.

Track listing

Personnel
Credits adapted from liner notes.

 Giorgio Moroder – writing, production, electronic keyboards, engineering
 Pete Bellotte – writing, mystery voice
 Robby Wedel – Moog programming
 Gitte – backing vocals
 Lucy – backing vocals
 Betsy – backing vocals
 Juergen Koppers – engineering
 Phyllis Chotin – art direction
 Henry Vizcarra – art direction, design
 Gribbitt! – art direction, design
 Ronald Slenzak – photography

Charts

References

External links
 
 

1977 albums
Giorgio Moroder albums
Albums produced by Giorgio Moroder
Casablanca Records albums